Joya de los Sachas is a canton of Ecuador, located in the Orellana Province.  Its capital is the town of La Joya de los Sachas.  Its population at the 2001 census was 26,363.

Demographics
Ethnic groups as of the Ecuadorian census of 2010:
Mestizo  75.4%
Indigenous  15.7%
White  4.3%
Afro-Ecuadorian  3.7%
Montubio  0.8%
Other  0.2%

References

Cantons of Orellana Province